The 2021–22 New Mexico State Aggies women's basketball team will represent New Mexico State University during the 2021–22 NCAA Division I women's basketball season. The Aggies, led by fourth year head coach Brooke Atkinson, play their home games at the Pan American Center and are members of the Western Athletic Conference.

Roster

Schedule

|-
!colspan=9 style=| Non-conference regular season

|-
!colspan=9 style=| WAC conference season

|-
!colspan=9 style=|WAC Tournament

See also
2021–22 New Mexico State Aggies men's basketball team

References

New Mexico State Aggies women's basketball seasons
New Mexico State
New Mexico State
New Mexico State